Wynford Newman Dore (born 10 June 1949) is a British businessman best known for promoting an exercise-based programme that he claimed to be an effective treatment for people with dyslexia, ADHD, developmental coordination disorder and other neurodevelopmental disorders. Although Dore's methods have proved controversial among experts in learning difficulties, who argue they are not evidence-based, he has received high profile endorsements from figures including sportsman Scott Quinnell. In 2008, the British and Australian arms of Dore's company went into administration.

Early life 

Wynford Dore was born in Tongwynlais, in the Taff Valley, South Wales. In 1959 his parents moved the family to Coventry in search of work. He gained a scholarship to King Henry VIII School and went into industry to study computing and systems design.  In 1992 he embarked on a 3 year programme at Harvard Business School – the "Owner President Management Program".

Career 

In 1974 he saw a business opportunity following the introduction of the Fire Precautions Act 1971. In response, he set up his own company Nullifire Ltd, offering fire protection products to public buildings including hotels and guesthouses.

At that time, as asbestos was being phased out, mineral fibre and cement-based products were considered the only option to protect buildings from fire. Dore decided to look for a more aesthetically pleasing alternative and eventually discovered a methodology for solving the need by using fire-resistant paint technology. He opened centres in Coventry and Paris to further the research and development of this technical breakthrough.

In 1998, Dore sold his business.  Following the sale of Nullfire, Dore was involved with a number of successful companies, including A-Zyme Ltd, Action! Telemarketing Ltd and Calktite Products Ltd, which were all later sold or merged.

Dore clinics 
After becoming aware of research into how skills are developed in the brain – driven by professors from Harvard Medical School and Roderick Nicolson of Sheffield University, Dore saw an opportunity to help his severely dyslexic daughter Susie, who had become increasingly depressed and suicidal and by her early twenties had tried to take her own life three times.

Dore took on medical and other specialists to test the cerebellar deficit hypothesis of dyslexia. Several research papers were peer reviewed and published showing encouraging results.

In early 2002, the Dore Programme was featured on UK primetime television, leading to an increase in demand.

Between 2006 and 2007, Dore opened 11 clinics, known as Dore Achievement Centres. At the clinics, people with dyslexia, ADHD and dyspraxia followed a programme of exercises designed to stimulate the cerebellum. Dore claimed that his programme has a success rate of over 80%.

Criticism and closures 
Dore's methods proved highly controversial with experts in the conditions that he claimed to have found a cure for.  Two papers were published in the academic journal Dyslexia based on a study utilising exercise as an intervention among a sample of schoolchildren in England. The publication of the first paper in 2003 led to the resignation of one member of the Editorial Board, while the second paper prompted five resignations. The study was criticised for including no control group. Potential conflicts of interest were also identified by journalists, including Dore Achievement Centres paying the first author of the study £30,000.

An article in the Journal of Paediatric Child Health argued that the published research evidence does not support the claims made by Dore and his supporters. One flaw of the research identified in the paper is that the participants are not diagnosed with dyslexia.

Australian TV network ABC TV's Four Corners progamme ran an expose that alleged a lack of scientific grounding for Dore's treatments, which reportedly led to a 50% decrease in revenue.

In May 2008 the DDAT company (Dyslexia Dyspraxia Attention Treatment), which operated the clinics, went into liquidation in the UK."The Dore Group", operating 13 Australian clinics in, went into voluntary administration in june 2008. 175 staff were made redundant as a result.

Other business activity 

Dore currently has a number of other business interests. In 1999 he bought Arnold Lodge School in Leamington Spa, Warwickshire, with his cousin Gareth Newman, CBE.

Arnold Lodge is a co-educational independent school with 300 pupils, ranging from nursery-aged to Sixth Form pupils aged 18. In 2020, the school was shortlisted for the Times Educational Supplement award of Senior School of the Year.

Education Development International 

In 1999 he partnered with Newman, a retired headmaster who was once an advisor on education to the Government, believed that the key to motivating children was allowing them to set their own targets, with their progress being monitored regularly.

Keen for other children to benefit from the same technique, Dore developed online test software that could be rolled out and used at all schools up and down the country.

This product went on to become Education Development International plc, the 4th largest examination board in the UK that provides online tests and assessments for schools, vocational entities and professional organisations.

In 2011 it was sold to Pearson plc, the world's largest education company.

Brigade Clothing 

Dore is the former co-owner and director of Brigade Clothing, a major supplier of quality school-wear.

Books 
Dore published Dyslexia: The Miracle Cure in 2006 and "Stop Struggling in School" in 2018.

Personal life 
Dore has four children; Susie, Rosie, Glyn and Gareth. He lives in Warwickshire.

External links 
 Zing Performance website
 Arnold Lodge website
 Nullifire website

References

1949 births
Living people
20th-century Welsh businesspeople
21st-century Welsh businesspeople
Harvard Business School alumni